Ocenebra erinaceus, common name the European sting winkle, is a species of predatory sea snail, a marine gastropod mollusk in the family Muricidae, the murex and rock snails. Also known as the Oyster Drill, it is a pest in Oyster beds.

The name Ocenebra erinaceus is the accepted name according to the database World Register of Marine Species (WoRMS), and the name is also accepted as valid by the ICZN (Op. 886)

Description
The size of the shell varies between 8 mm and 65 mm. The shell has four to seven varicose, nodulous, encircled by prominent cord-like, raised ribs. These are alternately smaller, the smaller ones minutely scabrous. The varices are sometimes frondose, sometimes lamellated, occasionally appressed. Occasionally the larger revolving ribs thickly overlap the varices, forming a succession of elongated nodules  The color of the shell is yellowish-brown and whitish within.

Distribution
This marine species occurs in European waters from Norway to the Black Sea; in the Atlantic Ocean off the Azores and Madeira

Synonyms

 Cenebra erinacea
 Murex bicristatus Risso, 1826
 Murex cinguliferus Lamarck, 1822
 Murex duthiersi Velain, 1877
 Murex erinaceus Linnaeus, 1758 (original combination)
 Murex erinaceus var. amirrus de Gregorio, 1885
 Murex erinaceus var. benisafiensis Koch in Pallary, 1900
 Murex erinaceus var. conspersa Dautzenberg, 1887
 Murex erinaceus var. depauperata Dautzenberg, 1887
 Murex erinaceus var. fasciata Dautzenberg, 1887
 Murex erinaceus var. fusca Dautzenberg, 1887
 Murex erinaceus var. major Dautzenberg, 1920
 Murex erinaceus var. mutica Dautzenberg & Durouchoux, 1913
 Murex erinaceus var. sculpta Jeffreys, 1867
 Murex erinaceus var. thersites Coen, 1933
 Murex erinaceus var. triquetra Coen, 1933
 Murex erinaceus var. venetiana de Gregorio in Coen, 1933
 Murex erinaceus var. viriditincta Dautzenberg & Fischer, 1925
 Murex hanleyi Dautzenberg, 1887
 Murex imbricatus Chiereghini in Nardo, 1847
 Murex labiosus Chiereghini in Nardo, 1847
 Murex orbignyanus Risso, 1826
 Murex pirotectus de Gregorio, 1885
 Murex tarantinus Lamarck, 1822
 Murex triquetra Risso, 1826
 Murex ungulatus Chiereghini in Nardo, 1847
 Ocenebra erinaceus elongatus Settepassi, 1970
 Ocenebra erinaceus var. africanus Settepassi, 1970
 Ocenebra erinaceus var. algerianus Settepassi, 1970
 Ocenebra erinaceus var. candida Dautzenberg, 1894
 Ocenebra erinaceus var. carneola Dautzenberg & Durouchoux, 1913
 Ocenebra erinaceus var. dilatatus Settepassi, 1970
 Ocenebra erinaceus var. foliosa Monterosato in Coen, 1914
 Ocenebra erinaceus var. ibericus Settepassi, 1970
 Ocenebra erinaceus var. neglectus Settepassi, 1970
 Ocenebra erinaceus var. pagodulinus Settepassi, 1970
 Ocenebra erinaceus var. producta Dautzenberg & Durouchoux, 1913
 Ocenebra erinaceus var. solidus Settepassi, 1970
 Ocenebra erinaceus var. squamulosus Philippi in Settepassi, 1970
 Ocenebra gibbosus var. acuminatus Settepassi, 1970
 Ocenebra gibbosus var. compositus Settepassi, 1970
 Ocenebra gibbosus var. elongatus Settepassi, 1970
 Ocinebra labiosus (Chiereghini in Nardo, 1847)
 Ocinebra labiosus var. fasciata Coen, 1933
 Purpura congener Roding, 1798
 Purpura senegalla Roding, 1798
 Tritonalia chicoroides Coen, 1947
 Tritonalia erinaceus (Linnaeus, 1758)
 Tritonalia erinaceus var. clathrata Coen, 1947
 Tritonalia humilis Coen, 1947
 Tritonalia lampusiopsis Coen, 1947
 Tritonalia mercaensis Coen, 1947
 Tritonalia rejecta Monterosato in Coen, 1947
 Tritonalia rotunda Coen, 1947
 Tritonalia ruscuriana Monterosato in Coen, 1947

References

 Linné C. von, 1758: Systema Naturae. Editio decima. 1. Regnum Animale Holmiae, Laurentii Salvii iv + 824 p.
 Röding P. F., 1798: Museum Boltenianum sive Catalogus Cimeliorum e tribus regnis naturae quae olim collegerat Joa. Fried. Bolten M. D. p. d. pars secunda continens Conchylia sive Testacea univalvia, bivalvia et multivalvia pp. VIII + 199 
 Lamarck ([J.-B. M.] de), 1815-1822: Histoire naturelle des animaux sans vertèbres; Paris [vol. 5: Paris, Deterville/Verdière] [vol. 6 published by the Author] 7 vol. [I molluschi sono compresi nei vol. 5-7. Vol. 5 (Les Conchiferes): 612 pp. [25 luglio 1818]. Vol. 6 (1) (Suite): 343 pp. [1819]. Vol. 6 (2) (Suite): 232 pp. [1822]. Vol. 7: (Suite): 711 pp. [1822]] 
 Risso A., 1826-1827: Histoire naturelle des principales productions de l'Europe Méridionale et particulièrement de celles des environs de Nice et des Alpes Maritimes; Paris, Levrault Vol. 1: XII + 448 + 1 carta [1826]. Vol. 2: VII + 482 + 8 pl. (fiori) [novembre 1827]. Vol. 3: XVI + 480 + 14 pl. (pesci) [settembre 1827]. Vol. 4: IV + 439 + 12 pl. (molluschi) [novembre 1826]. Vol. 5: VIII + 400 + 10 pl. (altri invertebrati) [Novembre 1827] 
 Nardo D., 1847: Sinonimia moderna delle specie registrate nell’opera intitolata: Descrizione de’Crostacei, de’Testacei e de’Pesci che abitano le Lagune e Golfo Veneto, rappresentati in figure, a chiaroscuro ed a colori dall’ Abate Stefano Chiereghini Ven. Clodiense applicata per commissione governativa Venezia pp. i-xi, 1-127
 Jeffreys J. G., 1862-1869: British Conchology ; London, van Voorst Vol. 1: pp. CXIV + 341 [1862]. Vol. 2: pp. 479 [1864] Il frontrespizio reca la data 1863 ma in effetti pubblicato nel 1864. Vol. 3: pp. 394 [1865]. Vol. 4: pp. 487 [1867]. Vol. 5: pp. 259 [1869] 
 Dautzenberg P., 1887: Une excursion malacologique à Saint-Lunaire (Ille-et-Vilaine) et aux environs de cette localité; Bulletin de la Société d'études scientifiques de Paris 9(2), 27 pp.
 Pallary P., 1900: Coquilles marines du littoral du Départment d'Oran; Journal de Conchyliologie 48 (3): 211-422, pl. 6-8
 Dautzenberg P. & Durouchoux P., 1913-1914: Les mollusques de la baie de Saint-Malo; Feuille des Jeunes Naturalistes 43-44 (Suppl.): 1-64, pl. 1-4
 Coen G., 1943: Revisione delle varietà della Tritonalia erinaceus. Monografia sul Murex (Bolinus) brandaris. Nuovi gruppi e specie di gasteropodi. Sul gruppo Pseudofusus Mts. 1884. Sulla Charonia seguenzae. ; Acta Pontifica Academia Scientiarum 7(1): 40-41
 Settepassi F., 1970: Atlante Malacologico. Molluschi marini viventi nel Mediterraneo, volume I ; Museo di Zoologia, Roma

External links
 

Ocenebra
Taxa named by Carl Linnaeus
Gastropods described in 1758